Shirakawa (written  or ; "white river") is a Japanese surname. Notable people with the surname include:

 , 72nd Emperor of Japan
 , 77th Emperor of Japan
 , winner of the 2000 Nobel Prize in Chemistry
 , Japanese actress
 , 30th governor of the Bank of Japan
 , Japanese voice actress
 , Japanese photographer
 , Japanese samurai and general in the Imperial Japanese Army
 , Japanese gravure idol

Fictional characters
 , a character in the manga series Kaichou wa Maid-sama!

Japanese-language surnames